3 Maja Street may refer to:

3 Maja Street in Bydgoszcz
3 Maja Street, Katowice